Joseph Dana (1742–1827) was an American clergyman.

Biography
Joseph Dana was born in Pomfret, Connecticut on November 2, 1742. He was a grandson of Benjamin, the third son of Richard, the progenitor of all that bear the name in the United States, who, according to the family tradition, was the son of a French Huguenot that settled in England in 1629. Joseph was graduated at Yale in 1760, studied theology, and was ordained on November 7, 1765, minister of the South society of Ipswich, over which he presided for sixty-two years. He died in Ipswich, Massachusetts on November 16, 1827.

Works
Many of Dana's occasional discourses were published.

Notes

References

1742 births
1827 deaths
American clergy
People from Pomfret, Connecticut
People of colonial Connecticut
Yale University alumni